Labeyrie may refer to:

 Labeyrie, Pyrénées-Atlantiques, a commune in France

People with the surname
 Antoine Émile Henry Labeyrie, French astronomer
 Louis Labeyrie, French basketball player
 Maurice Labeyrie, French rugby union player